The OM621 is an inline-four diesel engine produced by Mercedes-Benz, from 1956 to 1968. It was succeeded by the OM615 engine.

Design 
The OM621 is based on the petrol M121 engine, but features revised camshafts, cylinder head, pistons, and fuel injection system. After being replaced by the OM615, a  updated version of the OM621 engine was used solely in Unimog vehicles until 1988.

Models

OM621 (37 kW version) 
 1958–1959 W121 190D, 190Db

OM621 (35 kW version) 
 1961–1962 W120 180Dc

OM621 (40 kW version) 
 1961–1965 W110 190Dc
 1965–1968 W110 200D
 1966–1988 Unimog 421

References 

OM621
Diesel engines by model
Straight-four engines